"You're the One" is a song by American singer Dondria. It is the lead single from her debut album Dondria vs. Phatfffat. The song peaked at number 14 on the Billboard Hot R&B/Hip-Hop Songs chart.

Music video 
The music video for "You're the One" premiered on March 22, 2010 and was directed by G. Visuals.

Charts

References 

2009 songs
2009 singles
Songs written by Bryan-Michael Cox
Songs written by Jermaine Dupri